Gabriele Mehl (born 25 February 1967, in Hagenbach) is a former German rower. She won a bronze medal at the Olympic Games in 1992.

Career 
Mehl was Member of the rowing club "am Baldeneysee" in Essen, Germany. In 1987 and 1988 she and Meike Holländer formed a coxless pair team at the German Championship and scored second. At the World Championship in 1987 the team started as part of an Eight and scored fifth.

In 1990, Mehl and Holländer participated as a coxless four team with Cerstin Petersmann and Sylvia Drödelmann. After their victory at the German Championships they scored second at the World Championships in Tasmania. After the German reunification in 1990 the rowing clubs of western and eastern Germany united. As a newly formed coxless four team, Gabriele Mehl, Cerstin Petersmann, Judith Zeidler and Kathrin Haaker won the German Championship and scored third at the World Championship.

In 1992, Gabriele Mehl was member of a coxless four with Antje Frank, Birte Siech and Annette Hohn at the Olympic Games 1992. They scored third, arriving after both the Canadian and the American team.

Further reading 
 Nationales Olympisches Komitee für Deutschland: Barcelona 1992. Die deutsche Olympiamannschaft. Frankfurt am Main 1992 (German)

References

External links 
 Gabriele Mehl (database of Sports-Reference)
 German coxless four championships
 

1967 births
Living people
Rowers at the 1988 Summer Olympics
Rowers at the 1992 Summer Olympics
Olympic bronze medalists for Germany
Olympic rowers of West Germany
Olympic rowers of Germany
Olympic medalists in rowing
West German female rowers
World Rowing Championships medalists for West Germany
World Rowing Championships medalists for Germany
Medalists at the 1992 Summer Olympics
Sportspeople from Rhineland-Palatinate